In Spain, a judicial district is a territorial unit for the administration of justice, composed of one or more municipalities bordering and within the same province.

Among the municipalities that make up the judicial parties, one of them, usually the largest or highest number of contentious matters occur, it is called head of judicial party. In this head is the seat of one or more courts of first instance and instruction. Leading the rest of municipalities of the administrative area are the magistrates' courts.

History 

The first division that was done in Spain on legal grounds would be during the Roman Empire. The provinces are divided into conventus where the inhabitants of the district regularly met in the header to resolve legal issues. The people could go to either conventus according to their convenience and the distance that separated them, that is why the boundaries were unclear.

The first modern division of Spain in judicial districts was held in 1834 -through an approved Decree 21 April 1834 in which provinces- subdivided following the new provincial management of Javier de Burgos. Among the motivations employment decree games constituency in the elections to Parliament of the Kingdom, was and facilitates faster receivership. 1 in 1834 were recorded in Spain, except the provinces provincial, a total of 451 matches judicial.

Currently the number of these, variable throughout history, has been reduced. These divisions would be the basis for electoral districts and contribution. In 1868 there were 463 judicial districts and 8,000 municipalities. The judicial districts of the autonomous cities of Ceuta and Melilla are the 12th (Cádiz) and the 8th (Málaga).

Lists by autonomous community 
Spain is currently divided into 432 judicial districts.

Notes

References

External links 

 

Judiciary of Spain
Spain